Scoobachita Creek is a stream in the U.S. state of Mississippi.

Scoobachita is a name derived from the Choctaw language purported to mean "big reed brake".

References

Rivers of Mississippi
Rivers of Attala County, Mississippi
Mississippi placenames of Native American origin